is an autobahn in Germany.

The A 571 is one of the shortest autobahns in Germany, measuring 2.4 km. The autobahn is located entirely in a rural area east of Bad Neuenahr-Ahrweiler. The A 571's southern end is located at the three-way interchange Sinzig with the A 61.

The original plan of the A 571 was to link a much longer A 31, which was to end in Bad Neuenahr-Ahrweiler, at the A 61. However, the A 31 was cancelled south of Mülheim an der Ruhr due to community opposition, but not before a few vestiges of the project were left behind. The A 571's northern end is merely a ninety-degree curve back to the west, after which the road becomes a branch of the B 266, which continues into Bad Neuenahr-Ahrweiler as a grade-separated Kraftfahrstraße (expressway). The other vestiges are the easternmost section of the A 560 and all of the A 573.
This was to be the location of a three-way interchange with the cancelled A 31. Construction began in March 2009 on a project to extend the B 266 expressway across Bad Neuenahr-Ahrweiler and connect the A 571 to the A 573. The current northern terminus of the A 571 will become a three-way interchange with an upgraded B 266, according to current plans. Construction is estimated to finish by 2015.

Exit list

 

 

 

|}

External links
 Autobahn Atlas: A571


571